This is a complete list of Canadian Football League (CFL) retired numbers. A retired number is a jersey number that is no longer issued by a team in order to honour a player that had a significant impact on that franchise. In some cases, a player may have his number retired after his untimely death during or soon after his playing career.

Of the seven current franchises that retire jersey numbers, there have been 52 players to have their numbers officially retired. Ironically, the two youngest franchises, the BC Lions and Montreal Alouettes, have retired the most numbers with 10 and 11, respectively. The oldest continuous franchise in the league, the Toronto Argonauts, has the second fewest with four retired numbers. The Hamilton Tiger-Cats have the fewest retired numbers, with two. The CFL considers the histories of the Ottawa Rough Riders, Ottawa Renegades, and Ottawa Redblacks as one continuous franchise, so the jersey numbers represented by the Redblacks here include all three of these franchises. The Edmonton Elks and Winnipeg Blue Bombers have never formally retired a jersey number and instead honour numbers and, in some instances, do not re-issue them.

The most commonly retired number, if one includes Winnipeg's unofficial retired numbers, is the number 75, which has had its usage been discontinued by four teams. No player has had his number retired by multiple teams and, unlike Major League Baseball (who retired Jackie Robinson's number) and the National Hockey League (Wayne Gretzky), the CFL has never had a jersey number retired in favour of one player league-wide. Due to their short existence, none of the American-based CFL teams ever retired jersey numbers.

Retired numbers

Unofficially retired numbers

See also
Edmonton Elks Wall of Honour

References

Retired numbers
Canadian Football League
Sports culture in Canada